Aracelis Girmay (born December 10, 1977) is an American poet. She is the author of three poetry collections, including Kingdom Animalia (2011), a finalist for the National Book Critics Circle Award for Poetry. She is also Assistant Professor of Poetry at Hampshire College.

Early life 
Aracelis Girmay is of Eritrean heritage and from Santa Ana, California. She attended Connecticut College and earned a Master of Fine Arts from New York University.

Career 
Girmay's first collection was Teeth (2007), for which she won the Great Lakes Colleges Association New Writers Award.

In 2011, Girmay published Kingdom Animalia, for which she was named a finalist for the National Book Critics Circle Award for Poetry. At The Rumpus, Camille T. Dungy said, "Girmay writes of ways we can be brought together, and ways the world separates us." Junot Diaz has said his favorite poem is Kingdom Animalia'''s titular poem, writing in The New York Times:

I remember rereading these lines shortly after I lost my sister:

Oh, body, be held now by whom you love.
Whole years will be spent, underneath these impossible stars,
when dirt’s the only animal who will sleep with you
& touch you with
its mouth.

And I was never the same.The Black Maria (2016) was Girmay's third collection. Selecting The Black Maria as a "Pick of the Week" in April 2016, Publishers Weekly described it as "a moving collection of lyrical, image-thick poems that balance on the knife edge separating vulnerability and unapologetic strength." The Boston Globe named it one of the best books of 2016.

Girmay is an Assistant Professor of Poetry at Hampshire College.

 Awards 
2009 winner, Great Lakes Colleges Association New Writers Award

 2011 finalist, National Book Critics Circle Award, poetry, for Kingdom Animalia 2015 winner, Whiting Award for poetry

 Works 
 Teeth Willimantic, CT: Curbstone Press, 2007. , 
 Changing, changing, New York: George Braziller, 2005. , 
 Kingdom animalia : poems, Rochester, NY: Boa Editions, 2011. , 
 The Black Maria Rochester, NY: BOA Editions Ltd. 2016. , 

 References 

 External links 

 Interview with Aracelis Grimay at the Boston ReviewGirmay Interview by Claire Schwartz at the Bennington Review''

21st-century poets
Living people
African-American poets
American women poets
1977 births
Connecticut College alumni
21st-century American women writers
21st-century American poets
New York University alumni
American people of Eritrean descent
21st-century African-American women writers
21st-century African-American writers
20th-century African-American people
20th-century African-American women